Illale Devata is a 1985 Telugu-language drama film directed by Tatineni Prasad. It stars Akkineni Nageswara Rao, Raadhika and  Bhanupriya, with music composed by Chakravarthy. The film was produced by N. R. Anuradha Devi under the Lakshmi Films Combines banner. It is a remake of Singeetam Srinivasa Rao's debut Kannada film Haalu Jenu (1982).

Plot
Gopi Krishna (Akkineni Nageswara Rao) a middle-class guy leads a joyful life with his wife Lakshmi (Raadhika). Once it is diagnosed that Lakshmi is suffering from blood cancer, to protect her Gopi has to accumulate a huge amount for which he turns into a conman and misleads several people. In that process, he gets acquainted with a millionaire Durgamma (Annapurna) a shrew when he falsely, convinces her as their distinct relative and Radha (Bhanupriya), Durgamma's daughter falls for him. Learning it, Lakshmi requests to continue his friendship with Radha for her happiness he does so. Parallelly, the wheel of fortune makes Lakshmi & Radha friends when Lakshmi even cheers up Radha's love interest by hiding her identity. On the other side, trickster Gopi increases his plans day by day but unfortunately, once he was caught. At the same time, Lakshmi deteriorates and Gopi is unable to raise the fund when Radha arrives for his support. Here, Radha questions Gopi the reason behind his deeds then he reveals the entire truth. By the time, they reach hospital Lakshmi is terminally-ill. Finally, the movie ends Lakshmi uniting Gopi & Radha and breathes her last, happily.

Cast

Akkineni Nageswara Rao as Gopi Krishna
Raadhika as Lakshmi
Bhanupriya as Radha
Jaggayya as Dr. Rao
Gollapudi Maruthi Rao as Bhupal Rao
Prabhakar Reddy as Damodaram 
Allu Ramalingaiah as Appala Raju 
Nutan Prasad as Kalyana Ramudu 
Nagesh as Manager 
Sarathi as Attorney Babu Rao 
Arun Kumar as Anand
Telephone Satyanarayana as Dr. Varma
Annapurna as Durgamma 
Anitha as Doctor 
Mamatha as Nurse 
Nirmalamma as Doddamma

Crew
Art: Bhaskara Raju 
Choreography: Prakash, Surekha
Lyrics: Acharya Aatreya, Veturi
Playback: S. P. Balasubrahmanyam, P. Susheela, S. P. Sailaja
Dialogues: Satyanand 
Story: Palagummi Padmaraju 
Music: Chakravarthy
Editing: Kotagiri Gopala Rao 
Cinematography: S. Navakanth 
Producer : N. R. Anuradha Devi 
Direction: Tatineni Prasad
Banner: Lakshmi Films Combines 
Release Date: 1 May 1985

Soundtrack

Music was composed by Chakravarthy. Music released on AVM Audio Company.

References

1985 drama films
1985 films
Indian drama films
Films scored by K. Chakravarthy
Telugu remakes of Kannada films
1980s Telugu-language films